Chris Booth (born 30 December 1948) is a New Zealand sculptor and practitioner of large-scale land art.

He has participated in numerous land art projects and exhibitions internationally and created significant public sculpture commissions in NZ, Australia, the Netherlands, the UK, Germany, Italy, Denmark, France and Canada.

Early life 
Booth was born in Kerikeri in the Bay of Islands. He studied at the University of Canterbury School of Fine Arts before taking two years of specialist study in the United Kingdom with sculptors Dame Barbara Hepworth, Denis Mitchell, and John Milne in St Ives; and Quinto Ghermandi in Verona, Italy.

Style 
Chris Booth works closely with the land, earth forms, and indigenous peoples of the region(s) where he creates his monumental sculptural art works. His way of working emphasises communication and exchange between indigenous and colonial cultures and the creation of meaningful environmental art works.

A major current project is the SLS (Subterranean Living Sculpture) which Booth is developing in association with the Eden Project in Cornwall, UK. The major focus is to educate about the importance of lower plants and fungi for survival and the effect of climate change. Plans are underway to establish the SLS in New Zealand.

Critical reception 
Canadian author and curator John Grande commented, "What is more remarkable are the various forms of sculpture he has gone on to produce, entirely unique. While Booth's sculpture sometimes draws upon indigenous Maori and Aborigine characteristics, they remain unique, and capture aspects of topography, natural history, and landscape forms already extant in the places he works."

Awards and honours 
In 2011 Booth was awarded Honorary Fellow at Northtec Tai Tokerau Wānanga for 'outstanding and distinguished contribution to society'.  In 1982 Booth was the recipient of the Frances Hodgkins Fellowship at the University of Otago, NZ.

Public sculptures and exhibitions 
In Progress 2020-2021 1. ENTRANCEWAY TO KERIKERI AND WAIPAPA, NGATI REHIA AND OUR KERIKERI PROJECT, Kerikeri, NZ; Te Haa o te Ao – Breath of the World, kinetic sculpture reflecting what we are doing to combat climate change through the eyes of our school children, stone, steel; 1500cm x 700cm x 700cm. 2. HUNDERTWASSER ART CENTRE, Whangarei, NZ; Paradise Living   Sculpture, stone, wood, fungi; 500cm x 240cm x 45cm. 3. WATERCARE CENTRAL INTERCEPTOR INTEGRATED ART WORK, Auckland, NZ; x6 works in progress; wood, stone, local native ecosystem; variation in sizes.Kinetic Fungi Tower  Sculpture on the Gulf, Waiheke Island, New ZealandWaljin Beela , The Farmer Market River, Western AustraliaTransformation Plant, VanDusen Botanical Gardens, Vancouver, CanadaKaitiaki, Rotora Island, Auckland, New ZealandWurrungwuri, Royal Botanic Gardens, Sydney, AustraliaTe Whiringa o Manoko, Kerikeri, New ZealandWaka and Wave, Whangarei, New ZealandEcho van de Veluwe, Kröller-Müller Museum, NetherlandsNga Uri o Hinetuparimaunga, Hamilton, New ZealandPeacemaker, Wellington Botanic Gardens, Wellington New ZealandTaurapa Christchurch, New ZealandWiyung tchellungnai-najil (Keeper of the light), Gold Coast City Art Gallery, Queensland, AustraliaIn Celebration Of A Tor, Grizedale Forest Park, Cumbria, United KingdomGateway, Albert Park, Auckland

 Print, film, and media 
Booth was the subject of Woven Stone- a monograph'' published in 2007 by Random House, New Zealand.

Publications include:  'Public Art and Ecology, International Public Artists' Discourse on Ecology', Shanghai Literature and Art Publishing House, China, 2011, 'New Zealand Sculpture: A History', Michael Dunn, 2002;  'Chris Booth – Sculpture in Europe, Australia & New Zealand', Edward Lucie-Smith, Ken Scarlett and Gregory O'Brien, 2001; 'Chris Booth Sculpture', David Bateman 1993.

Films include: 'When a Warrior Dies', 1992, Valhalla Productions, Wellington, NZ; Director: Michael Hardcastle; 'Respecting the Earth', 2005, Director: Libby Hakaraia, Maori Television Kete Aronui series III; The Making of Wurrungwuri, 2013, Director: David Stalley, Brain in Hand Productions.

Website
http://www.chrisbooth.co.nz/

Map of Sculptures by Chris Booth

References

21st-century New Zealand sculptors
People from Kerikeri
1948 births
Living people
20th-century New Zealand sculptors
20th-century New Zealand male artists
21st-century New Zealand male artists